The 2012 World Field Archery Championships were held in Val-d'Isère, France.

Medal summary (Men's individual)

Medal summary (Women's individual)

Medal summary (Men's Team)

Medal summary (Women's Team)

Medal summary (Men's Juniors)

Medal summary (Women's Juniors)

Medal summary (Junior Men's Team)

Medal summary (Junior Women's Team)

References

E
2014 in French sport
International archery competitions hosted by France
World Field Archery Championships